The 6th Jutra Awards were held on February 22, 2004 to honour films made with the participation of the Quebec film industry in 2003.

Winners and nominees

References

2004 in Quebec
Jutra
05
2003 in Canadian cinema